Kirsi Boström (née Tiira; born 20 May 1968, in Parikkala) is a Finnish orienteering competitor and World champion.  She won the 1999 Classic distance World Orienteering Championships. She won a gold medal at the 1995 World Orienteering Championships in Detmold with the Finnish relay team. She received silver medals with the relay team in 1993 (West Point) and in 1999 (Inverness).

See also
 Finnish orienteers
 List of orienteers
 List of orienteering events

References

External links
 

1968 births
Living people
Finnish orienteers
Female orienteers
Foot orienteers
World Orienteering Championships medalists
Competitors at the 2001 World Games
People from Parikkala
Sportspeople from South Karelia